"(How Could You) Bring Him Home" is a song by American R&B singer Eamon. The song was released on September 15, 2006, as the lead and only single from his second studio album Love & Pain (2006). The song has peaked at number 61 on the UK Singles Chart.

Music video
A music video for "(How Could You) Bring Him Home" was uploaded to Eamon's VEVO account on October 25, 2009 at a total length of three minutes and 44 seconds.

Track listing

Chart performance

Weekly charts

Release history

References

2006 songs
2006 singles
Eamon (singer) songs
Jive Records singles
Songs written by Nina Woodford